Operation Volcano was a British operation to clear a village that the Taliban were using as a command and control node, consisting of 25 compounds, near the Kajaki hydroelectric dam in February 2007. The British troops came from Troops from 42 Commando, Royal Marines and 59 Commando, Royal Engineers. During the operation, the marines received fire from Taliban forces further in the compounds and from the village of Chinah. This threat was neutralized by air assets and Royal Marine's mortars.
Operation Volcano was part of the March–May 2007 Operation Achilles.

Some parts of this operation is described in the documentary Ross Kemp in Afghanistan aired 2008.

See also 
 Britain's role in the 2001-present Afghan war
 War in Afghanistan (2001–present)

Notes 

Volcano
Volcano
Volcano
2007 in Afghanistan